TNA Park is a multi-use stadium in Tarkwa, Ghana. It is currently used mostly for football matches and is the home ground of Ghana Premier League team  Medeama SC.
The stadium currently holds 10,000 people.
With the promotion of Emmanuel Stars FC to the Ghana Premier League at the end of the 2010–2011 season, the stadium became their home ground.

References

External links
Soccerway

Football venues in Ghana
Sports venues in Ghana
Medeama S.C.
Western Region (Ghana)